Matari Airport   is an airport serving Isiro, a city in Haut-Uélé Province, Democratic Republic of the Congo.

Airlines and destinations

Accidents and incidents
On 5 September 2005, a Kavatshi Airlines Antonov An-26B struck a tree and crashed  from Runway 31 at Matari Airport while on final approach in fog, killing all 11 people on board.

See also

Transport in the Democratic Republic of the Congo
List of airports in the Democratic Republic of the Congo

References

External links

Matari Airport at OpenStreetMap

Airports in Haut-Uélé
Isiro